The Wind in the Willows is a 1983 British stop motion animated film produced by Cosgrove Hall Films (the same team behind Truckers) for Thames Television and aired on the ITV network. The film is based on Kenneth Grahame's classic 1908 novel The Wind in the Willows. It won a BAFTA award and an international Emmy award.

Between 1984 and 1990, Cosgrove-Hall subsequently made a 52-episode television series, with the film serving as a pilot. The film's music and songs are composed by Keith Hopwood, late of Herman's Hermits, and Malcolm Rowe. The Stone Roses guitarist John Squire worked on the series as a set artist. Voice actors include David Jason, Ian Carmichael, and Michael Hordern.

Plot 

Bored of spring cleaning, Mole leaves his burrow home and goes for a walk in the meadow. He soon comes to a river where he meets and befriends Ratty, a water vole who lives on the riverbank. Ratty is eager for Mole to have new experiences and takes him on a journey down the river in his boat. They bring a Picnic basket and lots of food with them. They decide to have their picnic on the edge of the countryside, near the riverbank. They notice Badger out for a walk and invite him to join them, but he coldly declines and goes home. Ratty reflects that Badger is affable but reclusive, not caring for society and social events. Mole asks where he lives, and Ratty explains that Badger's domain, the Wild Wood, is not a safe place for animals such as themselves. Mole asks what kind of creatures live there that make it so dangerous, but is interrupted by the arrival of the Chief Weasel and his henchman before Rat can answer. While the Chief distracts them with pleasantries, his henchman steals a jar of potted meat. Ratty then warns Mole that, though the weasels might seem "all right in a way", they are not to be trusted. He then takes Mole to visit Toad at his grand, stately home, Toad Hall. Toad invites them to join him on a road trip in his latest source of amusement, a garishly-decorated gypsy caravan, with his horse Alfred pulling the vehicle. Having previously been obsessed with boating, Toad now has become bored of it and now wants travelling to be his new hobby, which is why he got the caravan. 

On the group's first camp out for the night, Ratty quietly reminisces about his home by the river, but declines Mole's suggestion that they return, needing to keep Toad out of trouble. The following day, disaster strikes as a passing motorcar spooks Alfred and sends the caravan crashing into a ditch. Toad impulsively decides that motor cars are his calling in life after seeing one go so fast, and he derides the "nasty, common, canary-coloured cart" as antiquated, proclaiming that motorcars are the only way to travel. Ratty and Mole can do nothing but look on as Toad buys and quickly crashes his cars one after another. As Summer and Autumn go by, Toad has been getting into trouble with the law. He repeatedly gets fined for his reckless driving, but Toad doesn’t care because of his immense wealth. He soon starts ending up in hospital in some instances, and Ratty and Mole fear Toad is going to get badly injured or worse, and are even more worried he will hurt someone else. After nearly crashing into some children, they try and help Toad but he’s too naive and silly to listen. 

By Winter, Ratty and Mole have had enough of trying to help Toad and decide to call on Badger to see if he can discipline Toad's enthusiasm for reckless driving. Ratty says it's too late in the day to go to the Wild Wood as it is getting dark, so Mole sets out alone to find Badger after Ratty falls asleep in front of the fire.

Mole reaches the border of the Wild Wood and encounters a weasel on the path. Forgetting Ratty’s advice never to trust the weasels, he asks for directions to Badger's house and is sent the wrong way. As night falls, he becomes lost and confused by the strange sights and sounds of the woods. The weasels begin stalking him, and the terrified Mole stumbles over tree roots in his desperation to get away. Lying exhausted in the snow, he calls out for Ratty, who is awakened by the crackling fire back at the riverbank. He reads a note left by Mole, explaining where he has gone. Fearing the worst, Ratty takes a brace of pistols and a cudgel and bravely enters into the Wild Wood. After some time searching, he finds a weakened Mole, who has literally stumbled across Badger's house, having tripped on a door scraper buried in the snow. Ratty digs in the snow a bit more, eventually finding a doormat. Ratty and Mole dig a bit more snow and find a door belonging to Badger, meaning they have found Badger’s underground home, a Sett. 

Initially angry at being disturbed, thinking that it’s the Weasels pranking him, Badger is pleasantly surprised to see that it's Ratty and Mole. He invites them inside and they warm themselves by the fire, discussing Toad's incorrigible passion for frivolous driving. He shows a photograph of him and Toad’s father back when they were in their youth playing Cricket, revealing they were once friends. Mole is happy being underground again, reminding him of his burrow.

The next morning they visit Toad Hall and Badger interrogates Toad, but Toad still refuses to take their advice to stay away from motorcars. Confessing that Toad's obsession is worse than he feared, Badger has Toad locked in his bedroom, under close observation by Ratty and Mole. The next day, Toad feigns illness and Ratty asks if Toad needs a Doctor. Toad instead asks for a lawyer to write his will. Fooled, Ratty asks Mole and Badger if he should. 

Toad then escapes and flags down a passing motorist named Reggie, who continually mistakes him for a frog, and his wife Rosemary. Posing as a fellow motorist, Toad asks them to inspect his "flat crank shaft" and steals their car as soon as they step out of it. Speeding away down the road, he almost collides with a responding constable, who he calls "fat face" as he passes by. 

Meanwhile, Mole breaks down in tears after he catches the scent of his home on the breeze. Rat feels terrible for not having noticed the signs that Mole was homesick, and he insists that they return to Mole End for Christmas. Ratty loves Mole’s burrow and Mole is happy to be home. Some young field mice come carol singing, and Rat and Mole invite them inside for Christmas dinner. When the field mice overhear Ratty and Mole talking about Toad, they inform them that Toad has been arrested. 

In the courtroom, the jury box is packed with weasels. The magistrate, Mrs. Carrington-Moss, sentences Toad to "twelve months for the theft, three years for furious driving, and fifteen years for the cheek," being that he called a constable “fat face,” with another year added "for being green", a total of twenty years' imprisonment. The jailer's daughter feels pity for Toad's unfair punishment and decides to help him escape by disguising him as a washerwoman. Toad uses the disguise to walk out of the prison gates and makes his way to a railway station, where he tricks the train driver into giving him a free ride home on the Train. However, it isn't long until another Train with the police, Reggie and Rosemary, Mrs. Carrington-Moss and the clerk are pursuing him on the other track. Toad's identity is discovered by the driver. Toad confesses the truth to the driver, who isn't sure of Toad's claim that he merely "borrowed" a motor car, but decides to help Toad escape, since he doesn't approve of motor cars, or of ordered around by law officials. He quickly slows his engine down, and Toad immediately jumps off and tumbles down the side of a hill and into a field. Due to being on a track, the police, Reggie, Rosemary, Mrs. Carrington-Moss and the clerk cannot stop and must keep going on the tracks. Toad is therefore able to avoid getting caught. 

Delighted to be near home once more, Toad then calls in at Ratty's house, where he is told by Mole and Ratty that the weasels have attacked Badger, thrown him out of Toad Hall and secured themselves inside. Toad is despondent, but Badger, who has recovered from the attack, has a plan to take back Toad Hall via a secret tunnel, the existence of which was confided in him by Toad's late father. Mole, using Toad's washerwoman disguise and under the instruction of Badger, pays a visit to the weasels and tells them that they will be attacked by an army of bloodthirsty badgers, rats, and toads. The story is false, concocted by Badger, but succeeds in destroying the morale of the enemy, as the Chief Weasel places most of his men at the gates and on the walls, which will make retaking Toad Hall from the inside easier. The following night, the friends sneak through the tunnel and surprise the weasels in the banqueting hall. Toad spends most of the battle swinging from the chandeliers, but eventually falls on the Chief Weasel, knocking him unconscious. 

After their victory, Badger, Mole and Ratty settle down and look forward to a peaceful future, until Toad flies overhead in his new contraption, a ”flying machine”. Toad's engine suddenly stalls and he crashes into the river. During the end credits, the river bankers are pulling Toad and his machine out of the river - life on the Riverbank and in the Wild Wood appears set to continue as before.

Behind the scenes
The weasels have a greater role and are considerably more villainous and menacing in this adaptation of Kenneth Grahame's beloved story. The main banqueting hall and grand staircase of Toad Hall were inspired by the ones in Loftus Hall, a country house on the Hook peninsula in County Wexford in the south-east of Ireland.

Cast 
 David Jason as Toad and the Chief Weasel
 Richard Pearson as Mole
 Ian Carmichael as Rat
 Sir Michael Hordern as Badger
 Beryl Reid as Mrs Carrington-Moss, the magistrate
 Una Stubbs as the Jailor's daughter and Rosemary, Reggie's wife
 Jonathan Cecil as Reggie, the motorist
 Brian Trueman as Henchman Weasel and various voices
 Allan Bardsley as Alfred the Horse, the Policeman and the Jailer
 Edward Kelsey as the Engine Driver and the Clerk

See also 
 The Adventures of Ichabod and Mr. Toad 
 The Wind in the Willows (1995 film)
 The Wind in the Willows (1996 film)
 The Wind in the Willows (2006 film)

References

External links 

 

1983 films
1983 animated films
British animated films
British children's films
1980s stop-motion animated films
Cosgrove Hall Films films
Animated films based on children's books
Animated films about frogs
Films about badgers
Films about mice and rats
Films based on The Wind in the Willows
1983 children's films
Animated films about rats
Films scored by Keith Hopwood
1980s children's animated films
1980s British animated films
Films shot in Greater Manchester
1980s English-language films
1980s British films
Films about weasels